The 1920 New York Yankees season was the 18th season for the Yankees. The team finished with a record of 95–59, just 3 games behind the American League champion Cleveland Indians. New York was managed by Miller Huggins. Home games were played at the Polo Grounds. The Yankees of 1920 were the first team in the history of Major League Baseball to have an attendance of more than one million fans.

Offseason 
The year started with a bang on January 5, when the Boston Red Sox sold their star pitcher-turned-outfielder Babe Ruth to the Yankees for $125,000. The sub-headline in The New York Times the next day read, "Highest Purchase Price in Baseball History Paid for Game's Greatest Slugger." This deal would live in infamy for generations of Boston fans, and would vault the Yankees from respectability (80 wins in 1919) to pennant contention.

Regular season
Babe Ruth, his wife, and three teammates were in a car accident on July 7, 1920 from which they were lucky to walk away. Ruth was driving the group back to New York from Washington where the Yankees had beaten the Senators the previous day. Nearing Wawa, Pennsylvania at 2:00 AM, Ruth missed a sharp curve, drove into a ditch, and totaled the car where it flipped on top of them. Ruth was able to move the vehicle, and all five made it to a local farmhouse where they were attended to. They were driven that same day to Philadelphia where they boarded a train for New York.  Ruth was in the lineup for the next game on July 8, 1920 where he went one for four with a triple against the Detroit Tigers.

The Indians won the pennant despite a horrific incident at the Polo Grounds on August 16. Yankees pitcher Carl Mays, another of several ex-Red Sox players who had come the Yankees' way, used a "submarine" (underhand) pitching style. He threw one up and in on Cleveland shortstop Ray Chapman, who tended to crowd the plate and apparently never saw the ball coming. Chapman suffered a severe skull fracture, and died the following morning. Mays was absolved of any wrongdoing, but the incident would haunt him for the rest of his life. Meanwhile, the Indians rallied around the memory of their shortstop, and won the season.

However, with Ruth leading the Yankees, and with his stunning total of 54 home runs, nearly doubling his own major league record from just the previous year, New York finished just a game behind the second-place Chicago White Sox and three behind the Indians. Ruth's 54 home runs marked an end to the dead-ball era, and ushered in a new style of play with an emphasis on power hitting. The Yankees had once been the "poor relations of the Polo Grounds", as Lamont Buchanan characterized them in The World Series and Highlights of Baseball. But the Giants had faded a bit in the late 1910s while the Yankees had grown stronger. The Yankees were now poised to take the next step to beginning the greatest dynasty in professional sports.

Season standings

Record vs. opponents

Roster

Player stats

Batting

Starters by position
Note: Pos = Position; G = Games played; AB = At bats; H = Hits; Avg. = Batting average; HR = Home runs; RBI = Runs batted in

Other batters
Note: G = Games played; AB = At bats; H = Hits; Avg. = Batting average; HR = Home runs; RBI = Runs batted in

Pitching

Starting pitchers
Note: G = Games pitched; IP = Innings pitched; W = Wins; L = Losses; ERA = Earned run average; SO = Strikeouts

Other pitchers
Note: G = Games pitched; IP = Innings pitched; W = Wins; L = Losses; ERA = Earned run average; SO = Strikeouts

Relief pitchers
Note: G = Games pitched; W = Wins; L = Losses; SV = Saves; ERA = Earned run average; SO = Strikeouts

Awards

Records 
Babe Ruth, 20th century record, Highest slugging average in one season (.847)

Notes

References 
1920 New York Yankees team page at www.baseball-almanac.com
1920 New York Yankees at Baseball Reference

New York Yankees seasons
New York Yankees
New York Yankees
1920s in Manhattan
Washington Heights, Manhattan